Ghulam Rasool Mehr (13 April 1895 – 16 November 1971) (غلام رسول مہر) was a Pakistani Muslim scholar and political activist born in Phoolpur, a village in the district of Jalandhar, British India.

Early life
Mehr went to primary school in Khambra, then to Mission High School in Jalandhar City. He then enrolled at Islamia College (Lahore), where he developed a fondness for the city and its culture. He felt that while Delhi and Lucknow were steeped deep in Eastern culture, Lahore, was a happy blend of the East and the West, owing to its closer affiliation to the British Raj.

Career
Mehr was deeply involved in the developments on the Indian political front. The Indian Muslims, apart from their participation in the Pakistan Movement, were agitated at what was happening, at that time, in the Muslim world. Young Maulana Mehr, who had just completed his education and who had a passion to serve the cause of freedom and the Muslim 'millat' (nation), began writing in the Daily Zamindar (newspaper) and eventually started working there.

In Lahore, Mehr meet Shibli Nomani and Nawab Waqar-ul-Mulk Kamboh, who were members of a delegation from Aligarh Muslim University. He also had the opportunity to listen to Allama Muhammad Iqbal recite his verses at the annual conference of Anjuman-e-Himayat-e-Islam.

Mehr also spent some time in Hyderabad. Though he did not succeed in getting a suitable job, living there gave him the opportunity to attain a 'political education' for himself. And it was in Hyderabad that he turned his attention from poetry to prose. This practice proved helpful, when he started his journalism career with an editorial published in the Daily Zamindar (newspaper) in 1921. Soon Maulana joined the paper and was in the thick of the battle going on in the name of freedom and Tehrik-i-Khilafat (Khilafat Movement). He had already joined Hizballah, an organisation started by Maulana Abul Kalam Azad. In fact, Azad was an important influence on Mehr and the latter drew inspiration from what was published in Al-Hilal (newspaper).

Mehr had made a brief survey of contemporary political and religious movements and his opinions of them. His circumstances did not allow him to complete his memoirs.

Death and legacy
Towards the end of his life, Mehr decided to record his life for the benefit of future generations. Mohammad Hamza Farooqi wrote the book Mehr Beeti, published by Al-Faisal Nashran, Lahore.
Mehr dictated it to his son, Farooq Arshad Shaheen and daughter, Muneera Alvi. There is an introductory note written by them which says that they had the opportunity to see their father and listen to him only during lunch time. It was at their ardent wisth that he tell his, from the early years to the end, including his devotion to causes close to his heart. Mehr once wrote in a letter to a friend that his children were eager to know about their family origins, due to his family's migration at the time of Partition of India in 1947, when they had to leave their land of birth, Phoolpur, a village in the district of Jalandhar.

Books
He "wrote, compiled, edited and translated over 100 books", including: 
Sīrat-i Imām Ibn Taymīyah, life and work of Ibn Taymiyyah, 1263-1328, Islamic scholar 
G̲h̲ālib, life and works of Mirza Asadullah Khan Ghalib, 1797-1869, Urdu poet
Navā-yi surosh, which has been described by critic Rauf Parekh as "the most voluminous of all commentaries on Ghalib’s Urdu divan."
Iqbāliyāt, on the life and works of Sir Muhammad Iqbal, 1877-1938; collected articles
Tārīk̲h̲-i Sindh, on the history of Sindh
Yawmīyāt riḥlah fī al-Ḥijāz, 1348 H / 1930 M, impressions of pilgrimage to Mecca, in Arabic
Sar ʻUmar Ḥayāt K̲h̲ān̲ Tavānah : savāniḥ ḥayāt aur un kī k̲h̲āndānī tārīk̲h̲ kā pas manẓar, on the life of Umar Hayat Khan Tiwana, 1874-1944, renowned politician from South Asia, includes historical study of his family.
siasiat e islamian hind.
Azadi ki jang.
Mukhtasar tarikh Islam.
Sayyed Ahmad Shaheed.
Sarguzhisht Mujahideen.
1857 ke Mujahid.

See also
Pakistan Movement
Allama Muhammad Iqbal
Aligarh Muslim University
Zamindar (newspaper)
Al-Hilal (newspaper)
Jalandhar
List of Pakistani journalists

References

Maulana Ghulam Rasool Mehar " Hayyat Aur karnamay "" written By Dr. Shafique Ahmed

External links
Maulana Ghulam Rasool Mehr Interview - From Audio Archives of archivist Lutfullah Khan

1895 births
1971 deaths
Iqbal scholars
20th-century Muslim scholars of Islam
Urdu critics
Pakistan Movement activists
20th-century Pakistani historians
Urdu-language journalists
Pakistani translators
Pakistani literary critics
Writers from Lahore
Journalists from Lahore
Pakistani newspaper editors
Punjabi people
20th-century translators